Charles Foster Johnson (born April 13, 1953) is an American blogger, software developer, and former jazz guitarist.
He has played on 30 albums, sometimes credited as Icarus Johnson. He blogs on Little Green Footballs.

Biography
Johnson was born in New York and raised in Hawaii. He launched his first career (as a jazz guitarist) in the mid-1970s. Extensive recording credits include at least three albums that went gold: Reach For It by George Duke, School Days by Stanley Clarke, and Live in London by Al Jarreau. He was a member of Richard Page and Steve George's pre-Mr. Mister band, Pages and played on the band's biggest hit, "I Do Believe in You."

He later co-founded CodeHead Technologies,
which marketed productivity and desktop publishing software (mostly written in assembly language) for the Atari ST personal computer. 	 
In 2001, Johnson founded a web design firm called "Little Green Footballs" with his brother Michael. Little Green Footballs began as a testbed on the company's website.

Johnson was raised Roman Catholic but now considers himself an agnostic.

Johnson is a co-founder of Pajamas Media, selling his stake in 2007.

Killian memos

Johnson, and other bloggers, gained attention during the 2004 U.S. presidential election for their role in questioning the authenticity of several memos purporting to document irregularities in George W. Bush's National Guard service record. (See Killian documents and Killian documents authenticity issues.) CBS news anchor Dan Rather presented the memos as authentic in a September 8, 2004 report on 60 Minutes Wednesday, two months before the vote. Days after the broadcast, Johnson alleged the documents, supposedly typewritten in 1973, could have been created easily on a modern computer using Microsoft Word.

Discography 
1976 School Days with Stanley Clarke
1977 I'm Fine, How Are You with Airto Moreira
1977 Reach for It with George Duke
1977 Easy Living with Sonny Rollins
1976 Garden of Love Light with Narada Michael Walden
1978 Don't Let Go with George Duke
1978 Don't Ask My Neighbors with Raul de Souza
1979 Follow the Rainbow with George Duke
1979 Future Street with Pages
1980 Nielsen Pearson with Nielsen Pearson
1980 Rocks, Pebbles and Sand with Stanley Clarke
1981 Pages [1981] with Pages
1982 Dream On with George Duke
1983 Not the Boy Next Door with Peter Allen
1984 In London with Al Jarreau
1984 Live in London with Al Jarreau
1987 All In the Name of Love with Atlantic Starr
1988 Guitar Workshop: Tribute to with Otis Redding 
1989 One Passion with Michael Paulo
1993 Art & Survival with Dianne Reeves
1994 L.A. with Hiroshima
1995 Piel Ajena with Eduardo Capetillo
1996 George Duke Greatest Hits with George Duke
1996 Is That the Way to Your Heart with Kazu Matsui
1998 A Song a Day 
2000 When I Hold You in My Heart with Clay Mortensen
2000 Rare Collection with Jaco Pastorius
2001 Pages [2001] with Pages
2003 Punk Jazz: The Jaco Pastorius Anthology with Jaco Pastorius
2003 In Between the Heartaches with Phyllis Hyman

References

External links

1953 births
20th-century American guitarists
American agnostics
American alternative journalists
American jazz guitarists
American male bloggers
American bloggers
American male guitarists
Guitarists from Hawaii
Guitarists from New York (state)
Killian documents controversy
Lead guitarists
Living people
21st-century American non-fiction writers
20th-century American male musicians
American male jazz musicians